In the 2014–15 football season, the U.S. Virgin Islands Championship was won by Helenites SC of the St. Croix Soccer League, beating Raymix SC of the St. Thomas League in the final.

Qualification

St. Thomas Soccer League

St. Croix Soccer League 

Helenites (champions)
Rovers (qualified)
other participants:
 Freewill                     
 Prankton                     
 True Players                 
 Unique

Source

Tournament

Bracket

Semifinals

Third place match

Final

References 

U.S. Virgin Islands Championship seasons
2014–15 in United States Virgin Islands soccer
United States Virgin Islands